Karsten Saniter (born 13 September 1965) is a German tennis coach and former professional player. He has coached several players including Michael Kohlmann, Michaëlla Krajicek, Björn Phau and Barbara Rittner.

Saniter competed as a professional player in the late 1980s and featured in the qualifying draw at Wimbledon, with a career high singles world ranking of 534. As a doubles player he had a main draw appearance at the Dutch Open and won one ATP Challenger tournament.

A native of Köln, Saniter he played his Bundesliga tennis for RTHC Bayer Leverkusen.

ATP Challenger titles

Doubles: (1)

References

External links
 
 

1965 births
Living people
German tennis coaches
West German male tennis players
Tennis players from Cologne